Yvon Ledanois (born 5 July 1969 in Montreuil-sous-Bois) is a French former professional road cyclist. After retiring from racing he embarked on a career in team management, joining  as a directeur sportif in 2008 and staying there for five seasons before joining the BMC Racing Team. He subsequently took up a DS role at  ahead of the 2018 season. He is the father of fellow racing cyclist Kévin Ledanois.

Major results

1989
 3rd Overall Ronde de l'Isard
1990
 1st Châteauroux–Limoges
 10th GP de Denain
1992
 8th Overall Tour de l'Oise
1993
 6th Overall Tour de l'Avenir
 8th Overall Tour Méditerranéen
1994
 4th GP du canton d'Argovie
 8th Tour de Berne
 10th Overall Tour de l'Oise
1995
 4th Tour du Haut Var
 5th Trofeo Laigueglia
 9th Overall Paris–Nice
 9th Overall Étoile de Bessèges
1997
 3rd Overall Tour de l'Ain
1st Stage 2
 6th Grand Prix d'Ouverture La Marseillaise
 9th Züri-Metzgete
 10th Overall Vuelta a España
1st Stage 7
1999
 8th Route Adélie
2000
 4th Paris–Camembert
 6th GP du canton d'Argovie

Grand Tour general classification results timeline

References

External links

1969 births
Living people
French Vuelta a España stage winners
French male cyclists